Wellawatta South Grama Niladhari Division is a Grama Niladhari Division of the Thimbirigasyaya Divisional Secretariat of Colombo District of Western Province, Sri Lanka.

St. Lawrence's Church, Wellawatte, Mount-Lavinia and Wellawatte are located within, nearby or associated with Wellawatta South.

Wellawatta South is a surrounded by the Dehiwala West, Galwala, Sri Saranankara, Pamankada West and Wellawatta North Grama Niladhari Divisions.

Demographics

Ethnicity 

The Wellawatta South Grama Niladhari Division has a Sri Lankan Tamil majority (57.3%), a significant Sinhalese population (26.1%) and a significant Moor population (13.8%). In comparison, the Thimbirigasyaya Divisional Secretariat (which contains the Wellawatta South Grama Niladhari Division) has a Sinhalese majority (52.8%), a significant Sri Lankan Tamil population (28.0%) and a significant Moor population (15.1%)

Religion 

The Wellawatta South Grama Niladhari Division has a Hindu majority (53.2%), a significant Buddhist population (20.4%) and a significant Muslim population (15.6%). In comparison, the Thimbirigasyaya Divisional Secretariat (which contains the Wellawatta South Grama Niladhari Division) has a Buddhist plurality (47.9%), a significant Hindu population (22.5%) and a significant Muslim population (17.4%)

Gallery

References 

Grama Niladhari Divisions of Thimbirigasyaya Divisional Secretariat